"Around the World" is the theme tune from the 1956 movie Around the World in 80 Days. In the film, only an instrumental version of the song appeared, although the vocal version has become the better known one. The song was written by Harold Adamson and Victor Young; Young died in 1956, several weeks after the film's release, and he received the Academy Award for Best Music, Scoring of a Dramatic or Comedy Picture posthumously. Young's orchestral version was a #13 hit on the Billboard charts in 1957. The recording by Bing Crosby was the B-side of the Victor Young version in 1957, on Festival SP45-1274 in Australia, and was a joint charting success.

Recorded versions
The song has been recorded, among others, by:
  
Karen Akers
John Arpin
Nora Aunor
Brook Benton (on the album "Endlessly" - 1959)
Stanley Black
Liam Burrows
Alvin and The Chipmunks - in a speeded-up version for their song The Chipmunk Song (Christmas Don't Be Late) (1958). 
The Chordettes - for their album Never on Sunday (1962).
Nat King Cole - recorded August 8, 1957.
Frank Sinatra - included in his album Come Fly with Me (1958)
The Columbia Ballroom Orchestra
Ray Conniff - included in the EP Ray Conniff Around the World (1963).
Sam Cooke - included in his album Songs by Sam Cooke (1958)
Bing Crosby (Billboard top hit (#25) in 1957, No. 5 hit in UK )
Gracie Fields (No. 8 hit in UK)
Eddie Fisher - a 1956 single release.
Connie Francis - included in her album Connie Francis Sings "Never on Sunday" (1961).
Buddy Greco - a single release in 1963.
Ronnie Hilton (No. 4 hit in UK)
Harry James
Joni James - included in the album 100 Strings & Joni in Hollywood (1961).
Jonah Jones
James Last
Steve Lawrence - for his album Winners! (1963)
Brenda Lee - for her album Emotions (1961)
The Mantovani Orchestra (Billboard top hit (#12) in 1957, No. 20 hit in UK)
The McGuire Sisters
Bette Midler for the live album "Live At Last" (1977).
Matt Monro - included in his album From Hollywood with Love (1964).
Jane Morgan and The Troubadours - included in her album Fascination (1957).
Emile Pandolfi
André Prévin
Louis Prima
George Sanders
Calum Scott for the soundtrack of the Hulu miniseries, ‘’Four Weddings and a Funeral’’. (2019)
The Shirelles
Frank Sinatra, in Come Fly with Me 1958 Capitol LP, arr & cond Billy May
Kay Starr - in her album Movin'! (1959).
The Supremes - a 1965 recording included in the expanded CD version of There's a Place for Us (2004)
Paul Sullivan
The Sundowners
Billy Vaughn
Bobby Vinton - for his album Drive-In Movie Time (1965).
Lawrence Welk and his Orchestra (The Lennon Sisters sang it on "The Lawrence Welk Show.")

Popular culture
The Buddy Greco recording was the first piece of music heard in the first episode of the 2012 television series Pan Am.

The song is used multiple times in various forms throughout the 2015 Japanese animated film The Anthem of the Heart.

The song is featured prominently in season 2, episode 6 of  The Marvelous Mrs. Maisel.

References

1956 songs
Number-one singles in Australia
Film theme songs
Jane Morgan songs
Songs with music by Victor Young
Songs with lyrics by Harold Adamson
1950s jazz standards
Nat King Cole songs
Music based on works by Jules Verne
Works based on Around the World in Eighty Days
Gracie Fields songs